Ahmad Alyaseer is a Jordanian director, producer and author.

Movies

When Time Becomes a Woman
Ahmad directed the first Jordanian Sci-Fi Feature When Time Becomes a Woman. The film was an experimental project for his graduation project submission at Middlesex University  and won awards at several film festivals yet it did not do well in Jordan. Critics praised the film for minimalist elements and was described as a "breath of fresh air in the genre". Despite the film's small budget, the crew got some impressive results.

TV Shows
The below are titles of TV shows produced and directed by Ahmad Alyaseer

Asfoureyyeh (The Nuthouse)
The series premiered on November 11, 2015, with Ro'ya TV, and was praised for being the first Jordanian Sitcom. A second season aired in 2017. Asfoureyyeh was the first acting experience for several Jordanian social media stars such as Omar Zorba, Lina Abu Rezeq and Rawsan Hallak.

Latt Wa Ajen
The mini- series premiered on 27, May, 2017 with the online channel Kharabeesh and Ro'ya TV in the month of Ramadan. The series marked the first acting experience for the Jordanian TV Presenter Nadia Al Zoubi. The show highlights women issues such as divorce, work, study and parenting.

Click
The show premiered on May 17, 2018, with Ro'ya TV  and Viu Streaming Service and was praised for its technical quality and concept it featured stars from different nationalities including the Syrian comedian Andre Skaf.

Jalta Season 2

The show premiered on May 5, 2019. The show was the most watched in Jordan and praised for bringing the light family Jordan sitcoms back after they were very popular in the early 90s.

Weapon Without Murder

The show premiered on October 25, 2019. Ahmad Alyaseer described the show as very challenging for being one of the very few modern Jordanian Dramas that the audience are not used to.

This is Earth

A light pan-Arab sitcom featuring social media stars from all over the Middle East. The show aired in April 2020. It was produced by Ahmad Alyaseer and directed by Alaa Ismail the director of El Plato. The show was on Shahid and MBC.

Ahlan Simsim

The Arabic version of Sesame Street. The show started broadcasting in 2019. It is part of The International Rescue Committee (IRC) and Sesame Workshop who have launched a joint initiative to provide millions of refugee children in the region with an educational programme in Arabic. The show has introduced three new muppets and was fueled by a $100 million grant provided by the MacArthur Foundation in 2017.

Books

My Trip to Adele
The novel is co-written with his sister Rana Alyaseer and was released on September 10, 2016 but was removed from online platforms in August 2017 for copyright infringement. The authors released the novel again without the lyrics. 
The novel was praised for its controversial topics such as atheism, child prostitution, black magic and divorce laws in third world countries.

Lasto Qedesa (I’m not a Saint) 
I'm not a saint (Arabic: لست قديسة) is the second novel by Ahmad and Rana Alyaseer. It is in Arabic and was released with Arab Scientific Publishers in May, 2018.

Between Wuhun and Finland, a Cold Sun

Between Wuhun and Finland, a Cold Sun (Arabic: بين ووهان وفنلندا شمس باردة ) is an Arabic novel released in January 2021 by Arab Scientific Publishers. It follows the story of four people who get involved in a conspiracy so much bigger than them about the corona virus.

References

External links
 My Trip to Adele Novel
 Lasto Qedesa Novel
 Ahmad Alyaseer IMDB Page
 When Time Becomes a Woman Trailer

Year of birth missing (living people)
Living people
Jordanian film directors
Jordanian writers
People from Amman